Mark Conrad Elliott (born 2 February 1966) is a former British boxer. He competed in the men's light welterweight event at the 1988 Summer Olympics. At the 1988 Summer Olympics, he lost to Ludovic Proto of France.

Elliott won the 1987 and 1989 Amateur Boxing Association British welterweight title, when boxing out of the GKN Sankey ABC and the Bennett's Bank ABC respectively.

References

External links
 

1966 births
Living people
British male boxers
Olympic boxers of Great Britain
Boxers at the 1988 Summer Olympics
People from Wellington, Shropshire
Light-welterweight boxers